= Autovía A-493 =

Highway in Andalusia, Spain

The Autovía A-493 is a highway in Spain. It passes through Andalusia.
